John Boyd "Tiny" Grant (August 17, 1933 – August 17, 2020) was an American college basketball coach for Fresno State and Colorado State.

Hailing from American Falls, Idaho, Grant played junior college basketball at Snow College in Utah for Jim Williams, then followed Williams when he became head coach at Colorado State (CSU). Following his graduation, Grant became coach of Mountain View High School in Wyoming before rejoining Williams at CSU as an assistant in 1961. Grant spent 12 seasons there before moving to Joe B. Hall's staff at Kentucky for two years. He was hired as head coach of the NJCAA's College of Southern Idaho (CSI) in 1974.

Grant proved highly successful in three seasons at CSI. His teams compiled a record of 93–6, won 49 consecutive games and won the 1976 NJCAA national championship (after playing in the final the previous year). His success landed him his first NCAA Division I job in 1977 as Fresno State hired him to replace Ed Gregory. Grant coached Fresno State for nine seasons, compiling a record of 194–74 and guiding the Bulldogs to three NCAA tournament appearances and the 1983 National Invitation Tournament title. He resigned following the 1985–86 season.

Grant returned to coaching in 1987 as head coach at his alma mater, Colorado State. He coached for four seasons, compiling an 81–46 record and NCAA Tournament appearances in 1989 and 1990. Grant retired from coaching in 1991.

Grant died on August 17, 2020 after suffering a stroke two days before.

Head coaching record

NJCAA

NCAA

References

External links
College record @ sports-reference.com

1933 births
2020 deaths
American men's basketball coaches
American men's basketball players
Basketball coaches from Idaho
Basketball players from Idaho
College men's basketball head coaches in the United States
Colorado State Rams men's basketball coaches
Colorado State Rams men's basketball players
Fresno State Bulldogs men's basketball coaches
High school basketball coaches in Wyoming
Junior college men's basketball players in the United States
Kentucky Wildcats men's basketball coaches
People from American Falls, Idaho
Snow College alumni
Southern Idaho Golden Eagles men's basketball coaches